Kincora is a residential neighbourhood in the northwest quadrant of Calgary, Alberta, Canada. Located near the north edge of the city, it is bounded by the Sherwood community across Shaganappi Trail to the west, the Sage Hill community across 128 Avenue N.W. to the north, the Evanston community across Symons Valley Road (Highway 772) to the east, and the Hidden Valley community across Stoney Trail to the south. It is one of five communities located within the Symons Valley area.

Kincora is represented in the Calgary City Council by the Ward 2 councillor.

Demographics 

See also 
List of neighbourhoods in Calgary

References 

Neighbourhoods in Calgary